In organic chemistry, a biphenol refers to compounds with the formula (C6H4OH)2.  Such compounds formally result from the coupling of two phenols.  

Three symmetrical isomers of biphenol exist:
2,2'-Biphenol (RN 1806-29-7) m.p. 109 °C
3,3'-Biphenol (RN 612-76-0) m.p. 124.8 °C
4,4'-Biphenol (RN 92-88-6) m.p. 283 °C

Additionally, three unsymmetrical isomers of biphenol exist:
2,3'-Biphenol (RN 31835-45-7)
2,4'-Biphenol (RN 611-62-1) m.p. 162-163 °C
3,4'-Biphenol (RN 18855-13-5) m.p. 190 °C

Phenols
Biphenyls